Tatevik Sazandaryan (1916–1999), was a Soviet and Armenian operatic mezzo-soprano who became a member of the Supreme Soviet of the Soviet Union in 1958. She performed as a soloist at the Yerevan Opera Theatre from 1937 to 1961.

Biography
Born on 2 September 1916 in Khndzoresk, now located in Syunik Province, Sazandaryan grew up in Baku, singing as a soloist in the school choir from the age of 10. When she was 16 she moved to Moscow where she sang in a number of amateur performances. Once her talent was recognized, she studied in Moscow under Ruben Simonov. She began performing in concerts in 1933. She then returned to Armenia where she studied at Yerevan's school of music and drama under Sargis Barkhudaryan. In 1937, she became a soloist at the Yerevan Opera Theatre. She is remembered in particular for playing Parandzem in Tigran Chukhajian's opera Arshak II and Tamar in Armen Tigranian's David Bek. She also performed leading roles in Carmen, Aida and Eugene Onegin.

From 1961, she taught at the Yerevan Conservatory where she became professor in 1970. In parallel, she headed the solo singing department at the Theatre Institute of Yerevan. She gained an extensive reputation, performing in the principal cities of the USSR as well as in Persia, Sweden, Tunisia, Hungary, Syria (1956), Belgium (1958, 1962), Greece (1959), Czechoslovakia (1960), and France (1963).

Tatevik Sazandarian died in Yerevan on 6 October 1999. In May 2017, a commemorative concert was held in her honour at Yerevan's National Theatre of Opera and Ballet.

Awards
Sazandarian was honoured with many awards including the USSR State Prize (1951) and the Order of St. Mesrop Mashtots (1997). In 2016 a stamp was issued on the centenary of her birth. She is shown in the role of Almast in the opera of that name by Alexander Spendiaryan.

References

External links

1916 births
1999 deaths
People from Syunik Province
20th-century Armenian women opera singers
Operatic mezzo-sopranos
Soviet women opera singers
Soviet music educators
Armenian educators
Recipients of the Order of Friendship of Peoples
People's Artists of the USSR
People's Artists of Armenia
People's Artists of Azerbaijan
Stalin Prize winners
Communist Party of the Soviet Union members
Fifth convocation members of the Supreme Soviet of the Soviet Union
Academic staff of the Komitas State Conservatory of Yerevan